The 2013 Lale Cup is a professional tennis tournament played on outdoor hard courts. It is the first edition of the tournament which is part of the 2013 ITF Women's Circuit, offering a total of $50,000 in prize money. It takes place in Istanbul, Turkey, on 22–28 April 2013.

WTA entrants

Seeds 

 1 Rankings are as of 15 April 2013

Other entrants 
The following players received wildcards into the singles main draw:
  Hülya Esen
  Sultan Gönen
  Gülben Güldaş
  Melis Sezer

The following players received entry from the qualifying draw:
  Yvonne Cavallé Reimers
  Justyna Jegiołka
  Mayya Katsitadze
  Elizaveta Kulichkova

Champions

Singles 

  Donna Vekić def.  Elizaveta Kulichkova, 6–4, 7–6(7–4)

Doubles 

  Ekaterina Bychkova /  Nadiya Kichenok def.  Başak Eraydın /  Aleksandrina Naydenova, 3–6, 6–2, [10–5]

External links 
 2013 Lale Cup at ITFtennis.com

Lale Cup
Lale Cup
2013 in Turkish tennis
2013 in Turkish women's sport